Viktor Pavlovich Barannikov (October 20, 1940 — July 21, 1995) was the Soviet Interior Minister in 1991 and Russian Interior Minister from 1992 to 1993.

Career 
He was the interior minister of Russian SFSR from September 1990 to September 1991, the interior minister of the USSR after the August Coup against Gorbachev from August 1991 to January 1992. After the collapse of the Soviet Union, he became the Minister of Security and Home Affairs of the Russian SFSR (December 1991 - January 1992). General Director of the Federal Security Agency of the RSFSR (January 1992). Minister of Security of the Russian Federation (January 1992 - July 1993).

Barannikov initiated the transfer of power under the responsibility of the Interior Ministry to individual republics and ordered the militia to stay away from the political chaos engulfing the capital. He was dismissed by the President at the end of July 1993. As an excuse, an incident involving the Border Guard forces on the Soviet-Afghan border and the wasteful lifestyle of his wife Ludmila, which cost taxpayers around $100,000, was used. During the Russian Constitutional Crisis in September–October 1993, he tried to mediate between Boris Yeltsin and Supreme Soviet, who wanted to drag him to her side by nominating him as the Minister of Security. He was arrested and imprisoned for several months, soon after his release he died of a heart attack on July 22, 1995.

He was close to Boris Birshtein and Birshtein's Seabeco.

Further reading
 Ostrovsky, Alexander (2014). Расстрел «Белого дома». Чёрный октябрь 1993 (The shooting of the "White House". Black October 1993) — М.: «Книжный мир», 2014. — 640 с. ISBN 978-5-8041-0637-0

References

External links 
 https://web.archive.org/web/20060225155559/http://www.agentura.ru/english/dosie/fsb/story/
 https://web.archive.org/web/20060614194250/http://www.terra.es/personal2/monolith/russia.htm
 БАРАННИКОВ Виктор Павлович
 Баранников Виктор Павлович. История Современной России

1940 births
1995 deaths
People from Primorsky Krai
Defenders of the White House (1993)
People's commissars and ministers of the Soviet Union
Generals of the army (Russia)